The Ghost of Faffner Hall is a children's television series from Jim Henson Productions and the British ITV company Tyne Tees Television which aired from August 16, 1989 to November 11, 1989 in the UK, and slightly later in the US. The puppets for this show were created by Jim Henson's Creature Shop, and the series was recorded at the Tyne Tees Studios in Newcastle upon Tyne and directed by Tony Kysh, then senior director within that company's children's department.

Plot
Faffner Hall is a music conservatory that was founded by Fughetta Faffner. When Fughetta Faffner passes away, her ghost lurks in Faffner Hall and it is currently run by her great-great-grandnephew Farkus Faffner who hates music. Now, Fughetta must thwart Farkus' plans with the help of Mimi, Riff, and the Wild Impresario. During this time, they meet up with the famous musicians that visit Faffner Hall.

Characters

Main characters
 Fughetta Faffner (performed by Louise Gold) - The main protagonist of the series. She is the founder of Faffner Hall. When she dies, her ghost haunts the halls and ends up having to prevent her great-great-grandnephew Farkus from destroying the halls. Whenever Fughetta hears beautiful music, she ends up solidifying. Fughetta also has the ability to freeze time so that she can fix things in the present.
 Mimi (performed by Karen Prell) - A girl with a Southern accent who is one of the inhabitants of Faffner Hall.
 Riff (performed by Mike Quinn) - A boy who is one of the inhabitants of Faffner Hall. He serves as a second banana to Mimi.
 The Wild Impresario (performed by Richard Hunt) - He is one of the inhabitants of Faffner Hall and the resident piano player.
 Farkus Faffner (performed by Mak Wilson) - The main antagonist of the series who is the current proprietor of Faffner Hall. He is the great-great-grandnephew of Fughetta Faffner who hates music and only cares about money. Farkus has since been making various plans to drive Faffner Hall's inhabitants from Faffner Hall which go horribly awry.
 Faffner Hall Composer Busts - They are the busts of Ludwig van Beethoven, Wolfgang Amadeus Mozart, and George Frideric Handel. When Fughetta Faffner freezes time, she ends up having to consult with them in order to handle a specific situation.

Guest characters
 Great Uncle Fishknife - Fughetta Faffner's uncle who appeared in "Music Brings Us Together" to help Mimi, Riff, and Wild Impresario get Fughetta Faffner intangible after Farkus found a way to trap her in solid form.

Episodes

Cast

Muppet performers
 Richard Coombs as Ray (ep. 2), Piganini (ep. 4), Zookeeper (ep. 5), Mr. Director (ep. 8), Madame Mumu (ep. 12)
 Louise Gold as Fughetta Faffner, Mean Mama (ep. 7)
 Richard Hunt as The Wild Impresario
 Phil Knowles
 Angie Passmore as Zola (ep. 2), Tutie (ep. 2)
 Karen Prell as Mimi
 David Rudman as Dragon Son (ep. 11, uncredited)
 Mike Quinn as Riff
 Bob Smeaton
 Mak Wilson as Farkas Faffner

Special musical guests
 Thomas Allen as himself
 Ry Cooder as Janitor
 Derek William Dick as Fish the Wizard
 Thomas Dolby as himself
 Julia Fordham as herself
 Dizzy Gillespie as himself
 H.K. Gruber as himself
 Håkan Hardenberger as himself
 Gary Karr as himself
 Mark Knopfler as himself
 Nigel Kennedy as himself
 Los Lobos as Themselves
 Paddy Moloney as himself
 George Martin as himself
 Ladysmith Black Mambazo as Themselves
 Bobby McFerrin as himself
 Joni Mitchell as herself
 Marion Montgomery as herself
 Patrick Moraz as himself
 Youssou N'Dour as himself
 Gil Evans Orchestra as Themselves
 Michala Petri as herself
 Electric Phoenix as Themselves
 Courtney Pine as Saxophone Salesman
 Como String Quartet as Peter Bucknell, Hung Le, Peter O'Reilly, Glen Nichols and George Vi
 James Taylor as himself
 Yomo Toro as himself
 Steve Turre as himself
 Robin Williamson as himself
 David Sawyeras Himself

Critical reception
Alan Carter of People magazine lamented the absence of classic Muppets characters but otherwise gave the show a brief but favorable review: "This one sings."

See also
 List of ghost films

References

External links
 The Ghost of Faffner Hall at Henson.com
 
 The Ghost of Faffner Hall at the British Film Institute

1980s American children's television series
1989 American television series debuts
1989 American television series endings
1980s British children's television series
1989 British television series debuts
1989 British television series endings
American television shows featuring puppetry
British television shows featuring puppetry
ITV children's television shows
HBO original programming
Television series by The Jim Henson Company
Television series by ITV Studios
Television shows produced by Tyne Tees Television
English-language television shows